Herman Adriaan van Karnebeek (21 August 1874 – 29 March 1942) was a Dutch politician. He served as Minister of Foreign Affairs between 1918 and 1927 and, in that capacity, as President of the Assembly of the League of Nations from 1921 until 1922.

Biography

His father was Abraham van Karnebeek (1836-1925), a conservative liberal politician, who also served as Minister of Foreign Affairs, from 1885 to 1888.

Herman Adriaan van Karnebeek studied law at the University of Utrecht. A conservative liberal like his father, he served as Mayor of the Hague (1911-1918) before the staunchly pro-German Van Karnebeek became Minister of Foreign Affairs on 9 September 1918 in the first cabinet of jhr. Charles Ruijs de Beerenbrouck. He continued serving as Foreign Minister in the first cabinet of dr. Hendrik Colijn. He eventually resigned when his concept treaty with Belgium was rejected by a parliamentary majority on 1 April 1927. From 1936 until his death in 1942, he served as chairman of the Carnegie Foundation.

He died on 29 March 1942, aged 67, in The Hague.

Private life

Van Karnebeek was married to Baroness Adriana J.C. van Wassenaar van Rosande. One of his four sons, jhr. Maurits Pieter Marie van Karnebeek (1908-1985), was the mayor of Zwolle from 1940 to 1944.

In 1923 he bought the estate De Eese. As of 2013, the estate is still the property of the Van Karnebeek family. From 1889 onwards, he was a cricket-player for The Hague cricket club HCC.

Honours 
,1922. Grand Cross 
 1925: Grand Cordon Order of Leopold.
Order of Saint Sava, I degree

Notes

1874 births
1942 deaths
Dutch nobility
Jonkheers of the Netherlands
Ministers of Foreign Affairs of the Netherlands
Presidents of the Assembly of the League of Nations
Mayors of The Hague
Commanders of the Order of the Netherlands Lion
Recipients of the Order of St. Sava
Independent politicians in the Netherlands